Gephyroherpia is a genus of cavibelonian solenogasters, shell-less, worm-like mollusks.

Species
The genus contains 2 species:

 Gephyroherpia antarctica Salvini-Plawen, 1978
 Gephyroherpia impar Zamarro, Garcia-Álvarez & Urgorri, 2013

References

Cavibelonia